Saint Caraunus of Chartres (or Caranus, Caro, Chéron) was a 1st or 5th century Christian missionary in Gaul who was murdered by robbers.
His feast day is 28 May.

Life

According to legend, Caronus was a Roman of the 1st century A.D. who was a brilliant student in Rome.
He converted to Christianity and came via Marseille to Gaul to preach the Christian faith.
He was assigned by King Brenn of the Carnutes to a group of three priests sent by Saint Denis to evangelize the south of the Île-de-France.
He was assassinated by brigands on the road from Ablis to Chartres on the 5th day before the calends of June in the year 98 A.D.
He was canonized in Chartres around 800 A.D.
There are doubts about the veracity of this story, which may have been a 9th-century essay by a school pupil asked to write a story about a saint.

Another version says that Caraunus flourished in the 5th century A.D. 
He was born in Gaul to a Christian family of Roman origin.
After his parents died he gave away all his possessions and became a hermit.
A bishop ordained him as a deacon, and he became an itinerant preacher.
Near Chartres he found a small group of Christians descended from the converts of Saints Potentianus and Altinus.
From them he selected disciples to assist him in his preaching, and left for Paris.
His disciples hid, but the robbers killed him when they found he had nothing of value.
He was buried near Chartres, and later an abbey and a church were built over his grave.

Legacy

The town of Saint-Chéron, Essonne, between Chartres and Paris, takes his name.
The Stained glass windows of Chartres Cathedral include a stained glass window depicting the history of Saint Chéron in Bay 15.
There are eleven rows, each with two panels and border panels with rosettes, florets and interlacing.
The lowest row represents the stonemasons, sculptors and donors.
The other rows show scenes of the saint's life.

Monks of Ramsgate account
The monks of St Augustine's Abbey, Ramsgate wrote in their Book of Saints (1921),

Butler's account
The hagiographer Alban Butler (1710–1773) wrote in his Lives of the Fathers, Martyrs, and Other Principal Saints under May 28,

Notes

Citations

Sources

 

 

Gallo-Roman saints
5th-century deaths